Melina Vidler (born 20 February 1993) is an Australian actress, known for her role as Shay Turner in 800 Words, for which she won the Logie Award for Most Outstanding Newcomer in 2016.

Early life
Vidler was born in Brisbane and grew up in Samford, Queensland, the daughter of Kaylene and Wayne Vidler, a property developer. She has two older brothers, Beau and Brent.

In 2010, Vidler graduated from Ferny Grove State High School in Brisbane, and went on to study acting at the Queensland University of Technology. She later moved to Sydney, New South Wales to pursue an acting career.

Filmography

References

External links
 

1993 births
21st-century Australian actresses
Actresses from Brisbane
Australian film actresses
Australian television actresses
Living people
Logie Award winners
Queensland University of Technology alumni